Anisoscelis alipes is a species of leaf-footed bug in the family Coreidae. It has been observed in Costa Rica, Colombia, Panama, Ecuador, Venezuela., and Mexico. It was first described by French entomologist Félix Édouard Guérin-Méneville in 1833. Anisoscelis flavolineatus, previously considered a distinct species, is currently considered a synonym of A. alipes.

References

Insects described in 1833
alipes